The EAR 59 class is a class of oil-fired  gauge  Garratt-type articulated steam locomotives.  The 34 members of the class were built by Beyer, Peacock and Company in Manchester, England, for the East African Railways (EAR).  They entered service in 1955–56, and were the largest, heaviest and most powerful steam locomotives to operate on any metre gauge railway in the world.

Description
They were designed to haul 1,200-ton trains on 1.5% gradients and were the mainstay of freight services on the 330-mile run from Mombasa to Nairobi until the late 1970s.

During normal service, the locomotives were manned by two regular crews on a 'caboose' basis, one working and one resting in a van with sleeping accommodation, changing over at eight-hour intervals.

The engines, many with Sikh drivers, were kept very clean and well maintained. The most famous was 5918 Mount Gelai with a devoted crew known as the 'Magnificent Foursome' who worked her for 16 years. The two drivers, Kirpal Singh and Walter Pinto, simply took their holidays when the locomotive went into the works at Nairobi for scheduled maintenance.

According to railway photographer Colin Garratt (in 1975), "the overall condition of Mount Gelai is possibly unrivalled anywhere in the world today. Her cab interior is more akin to a Sikh temple than a locomotive footplate for its boiler face abounds in polished brasswork, embellished with mirrors, clocks, silver buckets and a linoleum floor".

Withdrawals started in 1973, with the last locomotive (Mount Gelai) removed from service in April 1980 when it was driven by its long time driver, Kirpal Singh directly to the railway museum. Mr Singh retired from railway service the same day. Together with Mount Gelai, Mount Shengena was also saved from the scrapyard and both are now preserved by the Nairobi Railway Museum.

In August 2001, Mount Gelai was removed from the Railway Museum, and towed to Kenya Railways main works for overhaul to operating condition. Between November 2001 and September 2005 the locomotive made three round trips to Mombasa hauling excursion trains. It was also used on at least one occasion to haul a freight train to Nairobi due to a diesel locomotive shortage. However, it has not operated outside the confines of Nairobi since 2005 and is unlikely to do so again due to operational restrictions and the at least partial replacement of Kenya's meter gauge rail lines with standard gauge lines.

In fiction
The 2018 Thomas & Friends special Big World! Big Adventures! introduced the character Kwaku, who is based on the EAR 59 class.

Names
The locomotives were named after mountains in East Africa:

 5901 Mount Kenya
 5902 Ruwenzori Mountains
 5903 Mount Meru
 5904 Mount Elgon
 5905 Mount Muhavura
 5906 Mount Sattima
 5907 Mount Kinangop
 5908 Mount Loolmalasin
 5909 Mount Mgahinga
 5910 Mount Hanang
 5911 Mount Sekerri
 5912 Mount Oldeani
 5913 Mount Debasien
 5914 Mount Londiani
 5915 Mount Mtorwi
 5916 Mount Rungwe
 5917 Mount Kitumbeine
 5918 Mount Gelai - preserved at Nairobi Railway Museum
 5919 Mount Lengai
 5920 Mount Mbeya
 5921 Mount Nyiru
 5922 Mount Blackett
 5923 Mount Longonot
 5924 Mount Eburu
 5925 Mount Monduli
 5926 Mount Kimhandu
 5927 Mount Tinderet
 5928 Mount Kilimanjaro
 5929 Mount Longido
 5930 Mount Shengena - preserved at Nairobi Railway Museum
 5931 Ulguru Mountains
 5932 Ol'donyo Sabuk
 5933 Mount Suswa
 5934 Menengai Crater

Notes

References

External links

 Nairobi Railway Museum unofficial page
 East African Railways and Harbours
 Steam in Kenya
 Railway Gazette

Beyer, Peacock locomotives
4-8-2+2-8-4 locomotives
East African Railways locomotives
Steam locomotives of Kenya
Steam locomotives of Uganda
Garratt locomotives
Metre gauge steam locomotives
Freight locomotives
Railway locomotives introduced in 1955